Yisrael ben Ze'ev Wolf Lipkin, also known as "Israel Salanter" or "Yisroel Salanter" (November 3, 1809, Zhagory – February 2, 1883, Königsberg), was the father of the Musar movement in Orthodox Judaism and a famed Rosh yeshiva and Talmudist. The epithet Salanter was added to his name since most of his schooling took place in Salant (now the Lithuanian town of Salantai), where he came under the influence of Rabbi Yosef Zundel of Salant.  He was the father of mathematician Yom Tov Lipman Lipkin.

Biography
Yisroel Lipkin was born in Zagare, Lithuania on November 3, 1809, the son of Zev Wolf, the rabbi of that town and later Av Beth Din of Goldingen and Telz, and his wife Leah. As a boy, he studied with Rabbi Tzvi Hirsh Braude of Salant.

After his 1823 marriage to Esther Fega Eisenstein, daughter of Yenta and Yaakov HaLevi Eisenstein (died August 1871, Vilnius), Lipkin settled with her in Salant. There he continued his studies under Hirsch Broda and Zundel, himself a disciple of Chaim Volozhin. Zundel exerted a deep influence on the development of Lipkin's character; he had stressed religious self-improvement (musar), which Lipkin later developed into a complete method and popularized.

Around 1833 he met the decade-younger Alexander Moshe Lapidos, who became his lifelong student and friend.

He was a tremendous Torah scholar. Around 1842, Lipkin was appointed rosh yeshiva of Meile's yeshiva (Tomchai Torah) in Vilna. When a minor scandal arose related to his appointment, he left the post to its previous inhabitant and moved to Zarechya, an exurb of Vilna. While there, he established a new yeshiva, where he lectured for about three years.

At Lipkin's suggestion, the Musar writings of Moshe Chaim Luzzatto, Solomon ibn Gabirol, and Menachem Mendel Lefin were reprinted and popularized in Vilna. He began to be known as Rabbi Salanter.

Despite the prohibition against doing work on Shabbat (the Jewish Sabbath), Lipkin set an example for the Lithuanian Jewish community during the cholera epidemic of 1848. He ensured that any necessary relief work on Shabbat for Jews was done by Jews. Although some wanted such work to be done on Shabbat by non-Jews, Lipkin held that both Jewish ethics and law mandated that the obligation to save lives took priority over other laws. During Yom Kippur (the Day of Atonement), Lipkin ordered that Jews that year must not abide by the traditional fast, but instead must eat in order to maintain their health, again for emergency health reasons. Some claim that, to allay any doubts, he himself went up to the synagogue pulpit on that holy day, recited the Kiddush prayer, drank and ate - as a public example for others to do the same.

In 1848, the Czarist government created the Vilna Rabbinical School and Teachers' Seminary. Lipkin was identified as a candidate to teach at or run the school. As he feared that the school would be used to produce rabbinical "puppets" of the government, he refused the position and left Vilna. Salanter moved to Kovno, where he established a Musar-focused yeshiva at the Nevyozer Kloiz.

He retained charge until 1857, when he left Lithuania and moved to Prussia to recover from depression. He remained in the house of philanthropists, the Hirsch brothers of Halberstadt, until his health improved. In 1861 he started publication of the Hebrew journal Tevunah, devoted to rabbinical law and religious ethics. After three months the journal had failed to garner enough subscriptions to cover its costs, so he closed it.

Lipkin lived for periods in Memel, Königsberg and Berlin. He devoted the last decades of his life to strengthening Orthodox Jewish life in Germany and Prussia. He also played a large role in thwarting an attempt to open a rabbinic seminary in Russia. Toward the end of his life, Lipkin was called to Paris to organize a community among the many Russian Jewish immigrants, and he remained there for two years.

Lipkin is known as one of the first people to try to translate the Talmud into another language. However, he died before he could finish this immense project. Lipkin died on Friday, February 2, 1883 (25 Shevat 5643), in Königsberg, then part of Germany. For many years, the exact location of his grave was unknown. Following a lengthy investigation, in 2007 the grave was located in Königsberg.

Personality and character
Lipkin was unique and his views were not always in the mainstream.

He was careful to always comply with the law, even where this was discriminatory against Jews. For example, in order to be able to legally travel outside of the Pale of Settlement, he became a master dye-maker. This enabled him to receive a permit allowing free travel within Russia.

Lipkin had an outreach philosophy and was the first major East European rabbi to move to Western Europe, where the Orthodox considered religious standards to be lower. He was considered one of the most eminent Orthodox rabbis of the nineteenth century because of his broad Talmudic scholarship, and his deep piety.

When the Ukase was established to require obligatory military service, they collected youths from the Jewish communities. Lipkin wrote to the rabbis and community leaders urging them to keep lists of recruits, so as to leave no pretext for the contention that the Jews shirked such service. At the same time, he fought vigorously through political connections in St. Petersburg for the nullification of the Cantonist Decree. He told his disciples that the day the decree was annulled (26 August 1856) should be declared a Yom Tov (Jewish holiday).

Teachings
Lipkin is recognized as the father of the Musar movement developed in 19th century Orthodox Eastern Europe, particularly among the Lithuanian Jews. The Hebrew term musar (מוּסַר), is from the book of Proverbs 1:2 meaning instruction, discipline, or conduct. The term was used by the Musar movement to refer to disciplined efforts to further ethical and spiritual development. The study of Musar is a part of the study of Jewish ethics.

Lipkin is best known for stressing that the inter-personal laws of the Torah bear as much weight as Divine obligations. According to Lipkin, adhering to the ritual aspects of Judaism without developing one's relationships with others and oneself was an unpardonable parody. There are many anecdotal stories about him that relate to this moral equation, see for example the following references.

The concept of the subconscious appears in the writings of Lipkin  well before the concept was popularized by Sigmund Freud. Already in 1880, the concept of conscious and subconscious processes and the role they play in the psychological, emotional and moral functioning of man are fully developed and elucidated. These concepts are referred to in his works as the "outer" [chitzoniut] and "inner" [penimiut] processes, they are also referred to as the "clear" [klarer] and "dark" [dunkler] processes. They form a fundamental building block of many of Rabbi Salanter's letters, essays and teachings. He would write that it is critical for a person to recognize what his subconscious motivations [negiot] are and to work on understanding them.

Lipkin would teach that the time for a person to work on not allowing improper subconscious impulses to affect him was during times of emotional quiet, when a person is more in control of his thoughts and feelings. He would stress that when a person is experiencing an acute emotional response to an event, he is not necessarily in control of his thoughts and faculties and will not have access to the calming perspectives necessary to allow his conscious mind to intercede.

Based on his understanding of subconscious motivation, Lipkin was faced with a quandary. Given that a person's subconscious motivations are often not apparent or under the control of a person and are likely to unseat conscious decisions that they may make, how is it then possible for a person to control and modify their own actions in order to improve their actions and act in accordance with the dictates of the Torah? If the basis of a person's actions are not controlled by them, how can they change them through conscious thought?

Lipkin writes that the only possible answer to this quandary is to learn ethical teachings with great emotion [limud hamusar behispa'alut]. He taught that a person should choose an ethical statement [ma'amar chazal] and repeat this over and over with great feeling and concentration on its meaning. Through this repetition and internal arousal, a person would be able to bring the idea represented in the ethical teaching into the realm of his subconscious and thus improve their behaviour and "character traits".

Lipkin felt that people would be embarrassed to study ethical teachings [limud ha'musar] in such a way in a normal study-hall [bet ha'medrash] and he therefore invented the idea of a "house of ethical teachings" [bet ha'mussar] that would be located next to an ordinary study hall and that would be designated for learning ethics in this way.

One of the more popular teachings of Lipkin is based on a real life encounter he had with a shoemaker one very late night. It was Motza'ei Shabbat (Saturday night after Shabbat) and Lipkin was on the way to the synagogue to recite Selichot. Suddenly he felt a tear in his shoe, so he looked around town to see if there was a shoemaker still open for business at this late hour. Finally he located a shoemaker sitting in his shop working next to his candle. Lipkin walked in and asked him, "Is it too late now to get my shoes repaired?" The shoemaker replied, "As long as the candle is burning, it is still possible to repair." Upon hearing this, Lipkin ran to the synagogue and preached to the public what he had learned from the shoemaker. In his words, as long as the candle is burning, as long as one is still alive, it is still possible to repair one's soul.

Famous disciples

Lipkin believed that accomplishment in spiritual growth is not limited to rabbinic figures but is also the realm of the ordinary layman. Therefore, his closest disciples included not only leading rabbis of the next generation but also laymen who would come to exert a tremendous positive influence on the physical and spiritual lot of their brethren. Nevertheless, there is little detailed information available concerning his non-rabbinic disciples.

Among Lipkin's most famous students were:
Naftali Amsterdam (נפתלי אמשטרדאם)
Yitzchak Blazer
Eliezer Gordon
Jacob Joseph
Yerucham Perlman
Simcha Zissel Ziv
Yosef Yozel Horwitz

His layperson disciples included figures such as the banker Eliyahu (Elinka) of Kretinga and the tea magnate, Kalman Zev Wissotzky.

Published works
Many of his articles from the journal "Tevunah" were collected and published in Imrei Binah (1878). His Iggeres HaMusar ("Ethical Letter") was first published in 1858 and then repeatedly thereafter. Many of his letters were published in Ohr Yisrael ("The Light of Israel") in 1890 (edited by Yitzchak Blazer). His disciples collected many of his discourses and published them in Even Yisrael (1853) and Etz Peri (1881).

References

Bibliography
 Etkes, Immanuel. Rabbi Israel Salanter and the Musar Movement. Jewish Publication Society. .
 Finkelman S. The story of Reb Yisrael Salanter; the legendary founder of the musar movement. New York, New York: Mesorah Publications, . .
 Goldberg, Hillel. The Fire Within: The living heritage of the Musar movement. Artscroll/Mesorah. 1987.
Goldberg, Hillel. Israel Salanter, text, structure, idea: the ethics and theology of an early psychologist of the unconscious. KTAV Publishing House. .

External links
 Jewish Encyclopedia: “Lipkin” by Herman Rosenthal & Jacob Goodale Lipman (1906). Now in public domain.
 
 Biography on www.ou.com
 Biography on Eli Segal's page
 An examination of the life and accomplishments of Reb Yisroel Salanter
 Iggeret ha-Mussar, the Letter of Ethics—Rabbi Salanter's most well-known work (PDF)
 Rabbi Isroel Salanter, the Haskalah and the "Theory of Secularization": An Analysis from a Folkloristic Point of View
 Family Tree
 Rav Yisrael Salanter biography from 1899

1809 births
1883 deaths
Lithuanian Haredi rabbis
Musar movement
Philosophers of Judaism
Rosh yeshivas
19th-century Lithuanian rabbis
People from Žagarė
People from Salantai
Rabbis from Kaunas